Magen (lit. Shield) may refer to:

Star of David, known in Hebrew as the Magen David
Magen, Israel, a kibbutz in southern Israel
Magen David Adom, Israel's emergency medical, disaster, ambulance and blood bank service
HaMagen, a Jewish defense organization active during World War I
MAGEN (security), a technology that prevents certain data from being displayed to unauthorized people
Mira Magen (born 1950), Israeli author
David Magen (born 1945), former Israeli politician
Zvi Magen (born 1945), Israeli ambassador

See also